Book censorship has existed in New Zealand since the colonial period. Initially the majority of book censorship was carried out by the Customs Department, which had the authority to refuse entry to books considered indecent. As time went on more branches of government became involved with book censorship including the police, Post Office, courts, Executive Council, Cabinet, and the Department of Justice.

During the First and Second World War, there was significant censorship of literature considered seditious or otherwise contrary to the war effort. In 1963 the book censorship system was reformed. All previous restrictions on books were lifted and the Indecent Publications Tribunal was created, the first organization in New Zealand whose primary purpose was book censorship. Before this, there was no requirement for lists of banned books to be made public. By the end of the 1960s, the Tribunal had banned three books and almost 3000 comics and magazines.

The Indecent Publications Tribunal's treatment of homosexuality changed significantly as a result of the Homosexual Law Reform Act 1986. Before the Act, many books were banned solely on the basis that because consensual sex between men was a criminal offence in New Zealand, any publication that dealt with homosexuality was dealing with crime and was therefore indecent.

The Indecent Publications Tribunal was replaced by the Office of Film and Literature Classification in 1994 when the censorship system was reformed. Classifications given to books by the Indecent Publications Tribunal remain in effect unless they have been re-classified since.

, 1319 books have been banned and an additional 728 have been restricted in some way. More than two-thirds of banned or restricted books were classified before 1987.

This article contains lists of books, comics, librettos, and pamphlets that have had legal restrictions on importation, sale, possession, or exhibition in New Zealand.

Before the Indecent Publications Tribunal (1841–1963)
The earliest New Zealand legislation solely for the purpose of censorship was the Offensive Publications Act 1892, although Customs regulations prohibiting the importation of indecent material had existed since 1858. The Offensive Publications Act outlawed "any picture or printed or written matter which is of an indecent, immoral, or obscene nature". In 1910 the Indecent Publications Act came into force, replacing earlier censorship legislation. The Act introduced the defence of literary, scientific, or artistic merit in a work. The purpose of this according to the Attorney-General John Findlay was to "protect the liberty which improves and ennobles a nation, while removing the licence which degrades".

Under the Customs Act 1913, any publication could be banned by an order of cabinet. In May 1921, following the First Red Scare, a cabinet directive came into force prohibiting "any document which incites, encourages, advises, or advocates violence, lawlessness, or disorder, or expresses any seditious intention". The Customs Department appointed a censor in July 1921 to deal with seditious publications. In 1922 it was decided that the role of the censor would be expanded to deal with indecent publications as well. The censor immediately released the majority of the novels on the Customs Department's banned list, except for most books about contraception.

The Customs Act 1913 prohibited the importation of all "indecent or obscene articles", which gave considerable discretionary power to the Customs Department as the terms "indecent" and "obscene" weren't explicitly defined. The definition typically used by courts followed the Hicklin rule. This changed in 1939 when the High Court considered factors such as literary merit and circumstances of publication in its ruling on The Decameron by Giovanni Boccaccio.

In 1923 the book Safe Marriage by Ettie Rout was banned to public outcry. As a result, a committee was created to advise the Customs Department on book censorship. By the 1930s, the Customs Department's advisory committee had fallen into disuse. The committee was reinstated in February 1953 and would last until 1963.

World War I period (1914–1920)
During World War I, power was given to the New Zealand Defence Force and later to the Customs Department to prohibit the importation of literature that was considered undesirable, usually for being seditious. Wartime censorship of books and letters continued for many months after the end of the war.

World War II (1939–1945)
Censorship of books, pamphlets, newspapers, telegraph, radio, mail, and public speech was extensive during World War II. Censorship regulations were drafted in September 1938 during the Munich Agreement and were brought into force on 1 September 1939. They established the Controller of Censorship, responsible for postal and telegraph censorship, and the Director of Publicity, responsible for press censorship. These two roles were created to prevent dissemination of prejudicial information and subversive reports. 

The Controller of Censorship had the power to "cause any postal packet to be opened, detained, or delayed", and many books were detained under the Controller's direction. Books were withheld for various reasons, including interfering with the war effort, having ties to communism, and being likely to cause strong sectarian strife or bitterness. Some innocuous books were withheld if they were in the same packages as suspected books.

In correspondence between the Controller of Censorship George McNamara and the Prime Minister Peter Fraser about the communist and pacifist literature entering the country by post, McNamara said

The list of banned books was never made public during the war and was generally kept secret, to the frustration of libraries and booksellers. Reluctant to waste their already restricted budgets and risk their import licences, libraries and booksellers avoided importing books they thought might be withheld, and librarians began to remove books considered dangerous to the common good during wartime. By 1940 the number of intercepted and withheld books had become substantial. Minister of Customs Walter Nash, having been a bookseller's agent, had a special interest in books and took charge of this branch of censorship. Nash created an ad hoc committee to advise the Controller of Censorship on which books should be released, with the intention of releasing as many as possible. Throughout the war, this committee made the majority of decisions in secret about the entry of books into the country.

The Censorship and Publicity Emergency Regulations were revoked on 6 September 1945.

Indecent Publications Tribunal (1963–1994)

Office of Film and Literature Classification (1994–present)

See also
 Book censorship
 Lists of banned books
 Censorship in New Zealand
 Indecent Publications Tribunal
 Office of Film and Literature Classification

Notes

References

Bibliography

 
 
 
 
 
 
 
 
 
 
 
 
 
 
 
 
 
 
 
 

New Zealand
 
Banned books
New Zealand